"Life Time" is the 11th episode in the eighth season of the CBS television series M*A*S*H. It originally aired on November 26, 1979; it was directed by Alan Alda and was co-written by Alan Alda and Dr. Walter D. Dishell, M.D., the latter of whom was the show's medical consultant, along with phantom assistance from authors W.C. Heinz, Ring Lardner, Jr., who had written the script for the film MASH, and even Richard Hooker, himself a former U.S. Army MASH unit surgeon, and author of the 1968 novel MASH: A Novel About Three Army Doctors, from which the film and series both drew their inspirations.

Plot synopsis

In an episode where the story is told in real time (with a clock shown in the bottom right corner of the screen to keep track of the elapsed time), a wounded soldier arrives at the camp with a lacerated aorta, and the doctors rush to perform an arterial graft within 20 minutes, or risk permanent paralysis.

Plot

As Hawkeye, BJ, Klinger, and Margaret are playing poker near the chopper pad, a chopper arrives with a wounded soldier with a lacerated aorta.  Hawkeye borrows a pocketknife from the pilot and opens the soldier's chest further to create room to close the aorta by pressing it against his spinal column to prevent further bleeding.  The clock then appears on the screen to time the 20 minutes as the nurses and medics arrive by jeep.  They place the littered soldier, named George, onto the jeep with Hawkeye holding the wound.  As they travel to the hospital, Hawkeye dispatches Margaret to fetch vascular clamps and Nurse Kellye to fetch arterial grafts from previous surgeries for replacement of the aorta.  He also sends Klinger to get a canvas bathtub and as much ice as he can find, as immersing the soldier in ice will slow the flow of blood and maybe buy some time for surgery to repair the aorta before too much blood is lost.

The doctors begin prepping the soldier for a graft, but the grafts retrieved by Kellye are too small.  More wounded have arrived, and one soldier (named Harold Sherwood) with extensive brain damage is beyond saving and near death.   BJ and Potter come up with the idea of taking an aortic graft from this soldier once he dies, but another wounded soldier (Roberts, portrayed by Kevin Brophy) who is a friend of Harold's pleads with BJ to save him instead of waiting for him to die.  Also, Hawkeye's patient, named George, has lost a great deal of blood.  Hawkeye exhausts all available resources to replace George's blood, at one point dispatching Klinger to call I-Corps (imitating Col. Potter's voice) to ensure no heavy fighting is occurring which would result in more casualties needing blood.  Winchester has George's blood type and agrees to submit himself to giving a pint.

Roberts continues pleading but BJ explains that most of Harold’s brain is gone; Roberts insists on being with Harold when he dies and remains angry that no effort was made to save him. As BJ works to collect the aortic graft, Father Mulcahey consoles Roberts by asking about Harold and whether he would sacrifice himself to save another – Roberts agrees that Harold would, without hesitation, and wants to tell George about Harold when he recovers. BJ rushes the graft to Hawkeye and the surgery is successful, but they find that 23 minutes have passed.  George's life is saved, but he may be paralyzed.  Later, in post-op, George regains consciousness and is able to move his toes, prompting a spirited celebration.

References

External links

M*A*S*H episode - Lifetime plot summary at Fandango

M*A*S*H (season 8) episodes
1979 American television episodes
Television episodes directed by Alan Alda